The 2011 FIM Motocross World Championship was the 55th F.I.M. Motocross World Championship season. It included 30 races at 15 events including Bulgaria, The Netherlands, the United States, Brazil, France, Portugal, Spain, Sweden, Germany, Latvia, Limburg, Czech Republic, the United Kingdom, Europe and Italy.

2011 Calendar
The 2011 calendars of the FIM Motocross World Championships promoted by Youthstream were finalised on 25 October 2010.
In MX3 two final rounds of the season, originally scheduled in Geneva (Switzerland) and in Spain on 4 and 11 September were cancelled on 20 July 2011.

Championship standings

MX1

Riders' Championship
Points are awarded to the top 20 classified finishers.

(key)

Manufacturers' Championship

MX2

Riders' Championship

Manufacturers' Championship

MX3

Riders' Championship

Manufacturers' Championship

Participants
 Riders with red background numbers are defending champions. All riders were announced with numbers on February 23, 2011.

MX1 participants

MX2 participants

MX3 participants

References

External links
 

Motocross
Motocross World Championship seasons